Strepsicrates is a genus of moths belonging to the subfamily Olethreutinae of the family Tortricidae.

Some species have been moved between this genus and Stictea.

Species
Strepsicrates brachytycha (Turner, 1946)
Strepsicrates ebenocosma (Turner, 1946)
Strepsicrates holotephras  (Meyrick, 1924)
Strepsicrates infensa (Meyrick, 1911)
Strepsicrates melanotreta (Meyrick, 1910)
Strepsicrates parthenia (Meyrick, 1888)
Strepsicrates penechra (Diakonoff, 1989)
Strepsicrates poliophora Bradley, 1962
Strepsicrates prolongata (Meyrick, 1932)
Strepsicrates rhothia (Meyrick, 1910)
Strepsicrates semicanella (Walker, 1866)
Strepsicrates sideritis (Meyrick, 1905)
Strepsicrates smithiana Walsingham, 1891
Strepsicrates tetropsis (Busck, 1913)
Strepsicrates thyellopis (Meyrick, 1926)
Strepsicrates transfixa (Turner, 1946)
Strepsicrates trimaura Diakonoff, 1985

See also
List of Tortricidae genera

References

External links
tortricidae.com

Eucosmini
Taxa named by Edward Meyrick
Tortricidae genera